Loren Schoenberg (born July 23, 1958) is a tenor saxophonist, conductor, educator, and jazz historian. He has won two Grammy Awards for Best Album Notes. He is the former Executive Director and currently Senior Scholar of the National Jazz Museum in Harlem.

In the late 1970s he played professionally with alumni of the Count Basie and Duke Ellington bands. In 1980 he formed his own big band, which in 1985 became the last Benny Goodman orchestra.

Career

Early years and education
Schoenberg was born on July 23, 1958, in Fair Lawn, New Jersey, where he attended Fair Lawn High School.

National Jazz Museum
Schoenberg is Senior Scholar of the National Jazz Museum in Harlem.

Discography
 1986 That's the Way It Goes (Aviva)
 1987 Time Waits for No One (MusicMasters)
 1988 Solid Ground (MusicMasters)
 1990 Just a-Settin' and a-Rockin ' (MusicMasters)
 1990 S'posin'  (MusicMasters)
 1992 Manhattan Work Song (Jazz Heritage)
 1999 Out of This World (TCB)
 2006 Black Butterfly (CD Baby/THPOPS)

With others
 Marian McPartland & Friends – 85 Candles: Live in New York, (Concord)
 James Williams – Jazz Dialogues Vol. 1–4
 Bobby Short – 30 Years at the Cafe Carlisle
 Benny Carter – Harlem Renaissance (MusicMasters, 1992)
 Benny Carter – Central City Sketches (MusicMasters, 1987)
 Jimmy Heath – Little Man Big Band  (Verve, 1992)
 American Jazz Orchestra – Ellington Masterpieces
 American Jazz Orchestra – Tribute to Jimmie Lunceford
 Benny Goodman – Let's Dance
 Doc Cheatham/David Murray/Allan Lowe – Mental Strain at Dawn

References

External links
Official web site

1958 births
Living people
American jazz tenor saxophonists
American male saxophonists
Swing saxophonists
Third stream saxophonists
Fair Lawn High School alumni
People from Fair Lawn, New Jersey
21st-century American saxophonists
21st-century American male musicians
American male jazz musicians
Christian McBride Big Band members
American Jazz Orchestra members